Pseudotrapelus dhofarensis is a species of Agama native to Oman.

References 

Reptiles described in 2012
dhofarensis
Taxa named by Daniel Andreevich Melnikov